The Montecchia Open was a golf tournament on the Challenge Tour and formerly the Alps Tour. It was played for the first time in 2001 at the Golf Club della Montecchia in Padua, Italy.

Winners

Notes

See also
Terme Euganee International Open, a Challenge Tour from event 2001–03, held at Golf Club della Montecchia in 2002

References

External links
Coverage on the Challenge Tour's official site

Former Challenge Tour events
Sport in Padua
Recurring sporting events established in 2013